Pickin' on Lynyrd Skynyrd: A Tribute is a tribute album by various bluegrass artists covering the songs of southern rock band Lynyrd Skynyrd. It is part of the Pickin' On… series.

Track listing
"That Smell" - 4:25
"Saturday Night Special" - 2:36
"Sweet Home Alabama" - 4:55
"I Know a Little" - 3:14
"You Got That Right" - 3:45
"Don't Ask Me No Questions" - 3:01
"Tuesday's Gone" - 3:47
"Call Me the Breeze" - 4:31
"What's Your Name" - 2:55
"The Needle and the Spoon" - 3:07
"Gimme Three Steps" - 3:09
"Free Bird" - 8:57

1998 compilation albums
Bluegrass compilation albums
Lynyrd Skynyrd